Champhung is a village located extreme west in Ukhrul district, Manipur. The village is connected by an inter village road Via Makuikong and is about 30 kilometers from the district headquarter and 4 Kilometers from Lungchong Maiphei - L.M Block. Champhung is flanked by Tora in the north, Somdal, Phalee and Teinem in the east, Leisan in the south-west and Senapati district in the west.

Population
According to the 2011 census, Champhung has 152 households with a total of 782 people of which 408 are male and 374 are female. Of the total population, 88 were in the age group of 0–6 years. The average sex ratio of the village is 917 females to 1,000 males which is lower than the state average of 985. The literacy rate of the village stands at 81.12% which is higher than the state average of 76.94%. The male literacy rate stands at 82.42% while the female literacy rate was 79.70%.

People and occupation
Agriculture is the main occupation of the settlers. The main crops grown in the village are rice, corn, and pulses of many varieties. Champhung is well known in Ukhrul district for its potato, mango, guava, and chili cultivation. The village also is home to various flora and fauna. Majority of the inhabitants are Christians.
Champhung Ramhon village has been declared as a Model village in Ukhrul district Manipur under SAGY Scheme in 2021. 

There are two localities in this village viz. Champhung Ramhon and A.Changta.   

It is a small village that values democracy – that is evidently clear from its diverse organizations within the village. It has its own customary constitution under Tangkhul Naga Long for their village functioning.

Religion and educational institutions

Aphung/Champhung is one of the Tangkhul villages that embraced Christianity very early. For this, the villagers got access to western education right from the coming of Christian missionaries to Ukhrul district. According to the 2011 census, the literacy rate of the village was 81.12% which is higher than the state's average of 76.94%.
People and occupation

The village is home to people of the Tangkhul Naga tribe who speak the Tangkhul language with a village dialect which is unique among Tangkhul dialects. Agriculture is the primary occupation of the inhabitants. Rice, maize, potato, mango and cabbage are some of the main crops grown in this village. The traditional farming system has been an integral part of this village livelihood since time immemorial and accordingly, it is closely interwoven with the intricate fabric of the society in culture, religions, and economy. The farming system covers wet paddy cultivation, slash and burn and the other allied agricultural activities comprising forest gathering, artisanship, crop festivals, kitchen gardening, domestication of birds and animals, fisheries, and rearing of edible insects. Rearing edible six-legged insects like Asian giant hornet, honey bees, green grasshoppers, etc.

Most of these practices are social and community-based activity and their importance is pertinently expressed in their various culture. They are very old practices and the production system are generally trivial, merely a paltry self-sufficient to safeguard the basic level of survival. The agriculture system is stagnated which is proved by the unremitting abject poverty of the village life plagued with malnutrition, ill health and lack of basic amenities like telecommunications, transport, and marketing.[13] However, in recent year there is a tremendous improvement in the rearing of the domestic animal and bird and especially fishery, producing approximately 1000 kg of fish (common carp and other local variety) per year. It is one of the villages that upholds afforestation programme with Government agencies with huge success and one of the villages that planted the highest number of trees thus far.

Artisanship is one of the old traditional practices of this village which include weaving, blacksmith, bamboo weaving, stone and wood carving works etc.[19] The artisanship constitutes one of the basic scales of their development index in the past.

Culture

Luira Phanit or the seed-sowing festival is perhaps still one of the biggest traditional festivals of the Tangkhuls Naga which are celebrated every year with great pomp and joy. This is a festival celebrated in every Tangkhul village at the beginning of the year though with some modifications now (the date of celebration differs from village to village), precisely to herald the coming of a new year and to commemorate the beginning of sowing the first seed for the coming year. This is the main agricultural festival of the year and its celebration spread over a period of about seven days in the olden days though the celebration does not extend that much longer nowadays.

Since the advent of Christianity in 1923 and in the years that followed, an understanding between the Christians and the non-Christians of this village was brought about in regard to the fixation of the date for its celebration wherein, 15 March of every year was exclusively set aside for this festival of which, hitherto it was usually celebrated a little earlier or later than this as per the climate and other factors. It is an almost a week-long celebration and even now the intensity of the celebration is quite immense. Some of the competition items during the festival includes folk song (this includes Yarra Laa, Champhung yaozala laa and khunrapun mazapun Laa, etc), folk dance, Luita Laa, high jump, long jump, wrestling, bamboo climbing, carrying rice pounding stick on the back, tug of war, trumpet, flute, violin, guitar drama, soccer, volleyball and many more. Tug of war is one showpieces of an event that really captivates the hearts of the audience with equal numbers of men and women/localities wise/ strongest among youths, etc. at each end of the rope (thingneira/lauthanre) trying to pull with their utmost strength.

The dying giant may not figuratively represent a human giant but it is about the practice tradition of carrying a giant load of paddy approximately 15–20 tins of unprocessed paddy rice is a popular age-old practice among Tangkhul Nagas during harvest time in the village situated in the west of Ukhrul district in Manipur. Lengvei Kaphung is a challenge for all men of the village. A giant load of paddy tightly packed in traditional specially hand weaved shawls. The handicrafts using bamboo sliver is another skill which is hand weaved into different shape and size of baskets for the different household purposes like containers, carpet and decorations.

References

Villages in Ukhrul district